Stellenbosch University is a public research university situated in Stellenbosch, a town in the Western Cape province of South Africa. Stellenbosch is the oldest university in South Africa and the oldest extant university in Sub-Saharan Africa, together with the University of Cape Town - which received full university status on the same day in 1918. Stellenbosch University (abbreviated as SU) designed and manufactured Africa's first microsatellite, SUNSAT, launched in 1999.

Stellenbosch University was the first African university to sign the Berlin Declaration on Open Access to Knowledge in the Sciences and Humanities.

The students of Stellenbosch University are nicknamed "Maties". The term probably arises from the Afrikaans word "tamatie" (meaning tomato, and referring to the maroon sports uniforms and blazer colour). An alternative theory is that the term comes from the Afrikaans colloquialism maat (meaning "buddy" or "mate"), originally used diminutively ("maatjie") by the students of the University of Cape Town's precursor, the South African College.

History 

The origin of the university can be traced back to the Stellenbosch Gymnasium, which was founded in 1864 and opened on 1 March 1866. The first five students matriculated in 1870, but capacity did not initially exist for any tertiary education. However, in the 1870s, the Cape Colony's first locally elected government took office and prioritised education. In 1873, four of the five 1870 matriculates became the institution's first graduates by attaining the "Second Class Certificate" through distance learning, and the gymnasium's student numbers rose to over a hundred.

In 1874, a series of government acts provided for colleges and universities, with generous subsidies and staff. A personal intervention by the Prime Minister in the same year ensured that Stellenbosch qualified, after initially being allocated to be purely a secondary school. Later in 1874, the institution acquired its first Professor and, in the coming few years, its capacity and staff grew rapidly. Its first academic senate was constituted at the beginning of 1876, when several new premises were also acquired. The first MA degree (in Stellenbosch and in South Africa) was completed in 1878, and also in that year, the Gymnasium's first four female students were enrolled.

The institution became the Stellenbosch College in 1881, and was located at the current Arts Department. In 1887, this college was renamed Victoria College; when it acquired university status on 2 April 1918 it was renamed once again, to Stellenbosch University. Initially only one university was planned for the Cape but after the government was visited by a delegation from the Victoria College, it was decided to allow the college to be a university if it could raise £100,000. Jannie Marais, a wealthy Stellenbosch farmer, bequeathed the money required before his death in 1915. There were certain conditions to his gift which included Dutch/Afrikaans having equal status to English and that the lecturers teach at least half their lectures in Dutch/Afrikaans. By 1930, very little, if any, tuition was in English.

In December 2014, specialists at the university performed the first successful penis transplantation on a 21-year-old man.

Name 
Although the university was originally named the University of Stellenbosch (Afrikaans: Universiteit van Stellenbosch), it nowadays uses two forms: the English version Stellenbosch University (abbreviated SU) and the Afrikaans version Universiteit Stellenbosch (abbreviated US). In all its official documents, such as degree certificates, as well as the university coat of arms, both the English "Stellenbosch University" and the Afrikaans "Universiteit Stellenbosch" are used.

Rankings 

The university is one of only three public universities in the Western Cape and one of about 20 universities in the country.

In the latest edition of the Times Higher Education World University Rankings, Stellenbosch University was ranked in the 251-275 category in the world and third in Africa. Another reputable ranking system, QS World University Rankings recently ranked the university at 390 in the world and also third in Africa.

The Leiden University ranked Stellenbosch 395th out of the top 500 universities worldwide on its CWTS Leiden Ranking list of 2013. This list also ranked the university second in both South Africa and Africa, behind only the University of Cape Town.

Stellenbosch University consistently ranks in the top 200 worldwide in law, politics and geography.

Stellenbosch University is ranked in the top 100 worldwide in development studies, theology, agriculture and forestry.

In 2012, Webometrics ranked Stellenbosch's web footprint 2nd largest in Africa, again behind the University of Cape Town.

The University of Stellenbosch Business School's MBA program was ranked 65th out of 100 MBA programmes of the leading business schools in the world the Aspen Institute's 2011-12 edition of its Beyond Grey Pinstripes survey. The USB is also the only business school in South Africa, as well as the rest of the continent, to be included in the Top 100 list.

The University of Stellenbosch Business School has triple accreditation (AMBA, EQUIS and AACSB accreditation) and is ranked second in Africa by Eduniversal. The University of Stellenbosch Business School is ranked in the top 100 worldwide in executive education by Financial Times.

Location 

Stellenbosch is located about 50 kilometres from Cape Town and is situated on the banks of the Eersterivier ("First River") in the famous wine-growing region and is encircled by picturesque mountains. Teaching at Stellenbosch University is divided between the main campus in Stellenbosch, the Tygerberg campus (where the Faculty of Medicine and Health Sciences is situated), the Bellville Park campus (where the University of Stellenbosch Business School (USB) is situated), and the Saldanha campus (housing the Faculty of Military Science at the Military Academy of the South African National Defence Force).

Language 
Stellenbosch University used to be a predominantly Afrikaans-medium university. However, as the student body became more diversified, pressure mounted for more classes in English.

Today, the university's language policy promotes multilingualism as a means to increase equitable access for all students and staff. Afrikaans, English and Xhosa are used in academic, administrative, professional and social contexts, and classes are offered in Afrikaans and English.

Students are allowed to write their assignments, tests and examinations in English or Afrikaans. The language of tuition also varies depending on the faculty. The Faculty of Arts for example, is 40% English, so courses are lectured bilingually and the language of most handouts or prescribed material is determined by the student.

At postgraduate level the language of tuition is determined by the composition of the class. Most advanced postgraduate courses are conducted in English. According to the 2016 language profile of the university, 40.7% of its students stated Afrikaans as their home language, 46.1% stated English, 0.9% stated English and Afrikaans, and 3.1% of students stated isiXhosa as their home language.

The language policy is still an ongoing issue for the university, since it is one of the very few tertiary institutions left in South Africa still offering tuition in Afrikaans. It is situated in the Western Cape province, where 67% of the population have Afrikaans as home language, and the only one of four universities in the province to offer degree courses in Afrikaans. Due to this, it is held in high regard by the Afrikaner community.

The university annually hosts the SU Woordfees, a predominantly Afrikaans-language festival of the written and spoken word.

Student profile 
Stellenbosch University's student racial profile is as follows:

Faculties and schools 

Stellenbosch University consists of about 150 departments divided amongst 10 faculties. It also has more than 40 research (and other) institutions.

The faculties that are situated on the main campus are:
 Arts and Social Sciences
 Science
 Education
 AgriSciences
 Law
 Theology
 Economic and Management Sciences
 Engineering

The faculties and schools that are not situated on the main campus are:
 Military Science — situated in Saldanha Bay
 Medicine and Health Sciences — situated in Tygerberg
 University of Stellenbosch Business School — situated in Bellville

The Southern African node of the Pan-African University is based in South Africa and will concentrate on space sciences.
This decision was connected with South Africa's bid to host the Square Kilometre Array of radio telescopes. In September 2009 Jean-Pierre Ezin, African Union commissioner for science, said the node at the University of Stellenbosch in South Africa was hoped to open in February 2010. According to University World News, however, The PAU project continues in other regions although Southern Africa has been lagging behind.

Facilities and services 

The Stellenbosch University Library has collections scattered around the campus outside of the main facility, and all of which are catalogued on a computerised database, using the university's original mainframe, a UNIVAC. There are several other satellite libraries servicing the different faculties, including the Theology Library, Law Library and Tygerberg Medical Library.

Stellenbosch University also has a Conservatory, with two concert halls. The Conservatory is the home of the internationally acclaimed Stellenbosch University Choir, who, along with being the oldest South African choir have received numerous awards overseas.

The university also has a 430-seat theatre, known as the HB Thom Theatre and an open-air amphitheatre. Accompanying these facilities is the university's own Drama Department, under the guidance of the Faculty of Arts and Social Sciences. The department regularly puts on plays, dramas, productions, cabarets and musicals.

The Stellenbosch University Botanical Garden is the oldest university botanical garden in South Africa.

The Langenhoven Students' Centre (Neelsie) houses the Student Representative Council, a food court, a cinema, a post office, a shopping centre, an advice office and all the student societies' offices. Student bands and various entertainment and activity promotions usually appear in the main food court during lunch hour.

The university has its own radio station known as MFM (Matie FM), situated in the Neelsie. It broadcasts a mix of music, news, entertainment and campus news over the entire Stellenbosch area at 92.6 FM.

The university also distributes regular publications, Die Matie (appearing every fortnight) for its students and Kampusnuus (appearing monthly) for its staff. An official yearbook, Stellenbosch Student, is published annually and presented to all graduating students. Matieland is the name of the official alumni magazine. It is published twice a year and distributed to some 100 000 alumni and friends of the university.

Sport 
Sports facilities for the more than 30 competitive and recreational sports that are supported by the university include Danie Craven Stadium, two large swimming pools (one under roof), the Coetzenburg Centre, a multi-purpose center for ceremonies and indoor sports,  playing fields, including two artificial hockey fields, a gymnasium, and a new football complex.
The university offers several sports to its students. Some of them are athletics, bouldering, badminton, basketball, canoeing, cricket, cross country running, cycling, fencing, golf, gymnastics, field hockey, judo, kendo, netball, rowing, rugby union, soccer, squash, surfing, swimming, taekwondo, tennis, underwater hockey, volleyball, water polo, and yachting.

Stellenbosch has served as a test site in 2006 for a set of proposed modifications to the rules of rugby union, commonly referred to as the Stellenbosch Laws.

Student housing 
Stellenbosch has 34 residence halls in configurations for women only, men only and mixed gender. Each residence is supervised by a resident head assisted by a House Committee of senior students. The House Committee assists students with security, maintenance, and social programs.} Each first year student on campus gets access to a be-well mentor who assist them with their social-emotional transition from school to university. Each residence for undergrads incorporates a laundry room, a common living room and a dining hall where meals are provided for which students book beforehand on their student account.

The number of available rooms in university residences is limited, which requires some students to find private boarding. Students in private lodgings are assigned to one of 6 Private Student Organisations (PSO), also known as Private Wards. These PSOs give private students exposure to the same campus experience as students residing in residences. The oldest residence is Wilgenhof men's residence, established in 1903.

The PSO wards are grouped into six clusters with nearby residences to form student communities (a seventh cluster is on the Tygerberg campus). For each of these clusters, a hub facility is being built, of which two have already been completed, namely amaMaties and Wimbledon. In this way, day students can enjoy the same benefits as residence students, such as mentor support, meals and a well-appointed place to go to between classes.

Controversies 
After almost 30 years, there has been one documented incidence of racism at the university since 1994, with the latest being of a white student urinating into study material of a black student.

Leaders

Notable alumni 
 James L Barnard, civil engineer and pioneer of biological nutrient removal in wastewater treatment
 Johannes Christiaan de Wet, legal scholar, professor, recognized as South Africa's most influential jurist.
 Friedel Sellschop, physicist and pioneer in the field of Nuclear physics.
 Baron Steyn, British Law Lord, Lord of Appeal in Ordinary.
 John Dugard, professor of international law at Leiden University former member of the International Law Commission ad hoc judge of the International Court of Justice.
 Lourens Ackermann, former justice of the Constitutional Court of South Africa.
 Edwin Cameron, Rhodes scholar and justice of the Constitutional Court of South Africa.
 Johan Froneman, lawyer and justice of the Constitutional Court of South Africa.
 Koos Bekker, businessman, billionaire chairman of Naspers.
 James Leonard Brierley Smith, ichthyologist, organic chemist and university professor. First to identify a taxidermied fish as a coelacanth, at the time thought long extinct.
 Jacob de Villiers, judge, Chief Justice of South Africa from 1929 to 1932.
 Nicolaas Jacobus de Wet, politician, lawyer, and judge. Chief Justice of South Africa and acting Governor-General from 1943 to 1945.
 Henry Allan Fagan, judge, Chief Justice of South Africa from 1957 to 1959.
 Lucas Cornelius Steyn, judge, Chief Justice of South Africa from 1959 to 1971.
 Pieter Jacobus Rabie, judge, Chief Justice of South Africa from 1982 to 1989. 
 Barend van Niekerk, lawyer and academic.
 Naledi Pandor, South African Minister of International Relations and Cooperation (South Africa).
 Christo Wiese, businessman, former billionaire, chairman of Shoprite (South Africa).
 Jan Steyn, judge and development leader.
 Beyers Naudé, theologian and anti-apartheid activist.
 Fritz Brand, judge of the Supreme Court of Appeal of South Africa.
 Jannie Mouton, businessman, founder and chairman of PSG Group.
 Monique Nsanzabaganwa, economist, politician and Deputy Governor of the National Bank of Rwanda.
 Sir David de Villiers Graaff, 3rd Baronet businessman.
 Etienne Leroux, writer and member of the South African Sestigers literary movement.
 Stuart Abbott, rugby player and former economics student.
 Sandra Botha, former Leader of the Opposition in the National Assembly for the Democratic Alliance (South Africa).
 Paul Cilliers, philosopher and complexity theorist.
 Markus Jooste, South African businessman and the former CEO of Steinhoff International.
 Ruann Coleman, artist and sculptor. 
 Pierre de Vos, constitutional law scholar. 
 Abraham H. de Vries, writer.
 Mark Nigrini, academic, accounting professor.
 Mari Rabie, Rhodes scholar, triathlete.
 Leopoldt van Huyssteen, soil scientist.
 Danie Craven, prominent Rugby player and sport administrator.
 Riaan Cruywagen, prominent news reader and voice artist.
 Willim Welsyn, singer, songwriter, guitarist and podcaster.
 Brian Currin, leading Human Rights lawyer.
 Casper de Vries, actor and comedian.
 Johan Degenaar, philosopher.
 Estian Calitz, economics professor.
 Billy Downer, public prosecutor.
 Cromwell Everson, composer of the first Afrikaans opera.
 Alfredo Tjiurimo Hengari, political scientist.
 James Barry Munnik Hertzog, former Prime Minister of the Union of South Africa.
 Mike Horn, South African adventurer.
 Liza Grobler, artist.
 Elsa Joubert, novelist.
 Uys Krige, playwright, poet and translator.
 Cornelis Jacobus Langenhoven, poet who composed words of Afrikaner anthem Die Stem.
 John Laredo, anti-apartheid campaigner.
 Lulu Latsky, first woman to earn a PhD at Stellenbosch (1930); zoologist and writer.
 Magnus André De Merindol Malan, last Minister of defence during the Apartheid era.
 D. C. S. Oosthuizen, (Daantjie Oosthuizen), philosopher, Christian, critic of Apartheid.
 Mark Patterson, private equity investor and founder of MatlinPatterson Global Advisors
 Peet Pienaar, controversial performance artist.
 André du Pisani, political scientist and professor at University of Namibia.
 Vern Poythress, Calvinist philosopher and New Testament scholar.
 Johann Rupert, businessman and founding trustee of the Nelson Mandela Children's Fund.
 Rona Rupert, musician and author of 33 Afrikaans books.
 Johannes du Plessis Scholtz, philologist, art historian and art collector.
 Frederik van Zyl Slabbert, former opposition politician who became chancellor of Stellenbosch University.
 Jan Smuts, former South African Prime Minister.
 Zanne Stapelberg, opera singer.
 Tom Dreyer, novelist and poet writing in both English and Afrikaans.
 Sampie Terreblanche, former professor of Economics at Stellenbosch and founder member of the Democratic Party.
 Craig Tiley, CEO of Tennis Australia and Director of the Australian Open.
 Gerhard Tötemeyer, former Namibian Deputy Minister of Local and Regional Government and Housing.
 Jonathan Trott, England Cricketer.
 Hendrik W. (H.W.) van der Merwe (BA 1956, MA 1957), founder of the Centre for Intergroup Studies, University of Cape Town.
 Deon van der Walt, internationally renowned opera singer.
 Japie van Zyl, deputy director of the Jet Propulsion Laboratory.
 Ntsiki Biyela, winemaker and businesswomen.
 Attie van Heerden, Olympian, rugby union, and rugby league footballer.
 Ernst van Heerden, leading Afrikaans poet.
 Johannes Frederik Janse Van Rensburg, former leader of the Ossewabrandwag.
 Eben Dönges, South African politician who was elected State President of South Africa, but died before he could take office.
 Andries Treurnicht, politician, Minister of Education during the Soweto Riots, founded and led the Conservative Party of South Africa.
 Hendrik Frensch Verwoerd, former apartheid-era Prime Minister of South Africa.
 Balthazar Johannes Vorster, former apartheid-era Prime Minister of South Africa.
 Daniel François Malan, former apartheid-era Prime Minister of South Africa.
 Johannes Gerhardus Strijdom, former apartheid-era Prime Minister of South Africa.
 Taryn Young, physician and epidemiologist.
 Martin Welz, investigative journalist and editor of South African investigative magazine Noseweek.
 Claudette Schreuders, South African sculptor and painter
 Lydia Baumbach, classical scholar
 Henda Swart, South African mathematician
 Vuyokazi Mahlati, social entrepreneur, gender activist and global director of the International Women's Forum
 Marina Joubert, senior science communication researcher at Stellenbosch University
 Ashley Burdett,  Zimbabwean cricketer
 Stefanus Gie, diplomat.
 Professor Novel Njweipi Chegou, molecular biologist and winner of the Royal Society Africa Prize in 2022.

See also
 List of South African open access repositories
 Rankings of universities in South Africa

References

External links 

 Stellenbosch University official site

 
Universities in the Western Cape
Educational institutions established in 1866
Public universities in South Africa
Stellenbosch
Forestry education
Forestry in South Africa
1866 establishments in the Cape Colony